The 2023 Michigan State Spartans baseball team represents Michigan State University in the 2023 NCAA Division I baseball season. The Spartans are led by head coach Jake Boss in his fifteenth-season, are a member of the Big Ten Conference and play their home games at Drayton McLane Baseball Stadium at John H. Kobs Field in East Lansing, Michigan.

Previous season
The Spartans finished the 2022 season 24–30, including 8–16 in conference play, finishing in twelve place in their conference.

Schedule and results
Reference:
{| class="toccolours" width=95% style="clear:both; margin:1.5em auto; text-align:center;"
|-
! colspan=2 style="" | 2023 Michigan State Spartans Baseball Game Log
|-
! colspan=2 style="" | Regular Season (4–3)
|- valign="top"
|

|-
|

|-
|

|-
|

|-
|- style="text-align:center;"
|

References

External links

Michigan State
Michigan State Spartans baseball seasons
Michigan State